Singarapettai is a town in Krishnagiri district in Tamil Nadu. In the 2011 census it had a population of 2253 in 537 households.

"Pambar" Dam is 6 km from here. It is 60 km from Krishnagiri, 9 km from Uthangarai, 30 km from Tirupattur and 65 km from Tiruvannamalai. It lies on NH 77. Near this town the attractions include a Perumal temple on the top of mountain, and a dense forest with various tourism attractions like Theerthavalasai Lake, Anguthi Water Falls, Cuckoo forest school, Temples and also in Singarapettai Extension Reserved forest kinds of Birds and Wild animals are available.

Transport

Roads
The town is situated on the NH66 Road which plies from Krishnagiri to Thindivanam via Mathur, Uthangarai, Singarapettai, Chengam, Thiruvannamalai and Gingee.PAVAKKAL is short route for Singarapet to Harur via Hanumantheertham. It is connected to Tirupattur via Vishamangalam, Pasalai Kuttai and Vengalapuram. 

Frequent buses ply from Singarapettai to Salem, Harur, Dharmapuri, Bangalore, Hosur, Krishnagiri, Tirupattur, Vaniyambadi, Chengam, Thiruvannamalai, Pondicherry, Melmaruvathur and Cheyyar.

Railways
The nearest railway stations are Samalpatti, Morappur, Tirupattur and Jolarpet.

Airways
The nearest airports are Salem and Chennai.

References

Cities and towns in Krishnagiri district